Tilsia Carolina Varela La Madrid (born 1994), is a Venezuelan chess player. She was awarded the title of Woman International Master in 2013.

Chess career
She has represented Venezuela at a number of Women's Chess Olympiads, including 2012, where she scored 3½/7 on board four, 2014 (6/8 as first reserve) and 2016 (4/9 on board three).

She qualified for the Women's Chess World Cup 2021, where she took Pauline Guichard to tiebreaks before eventually being defeated 2½-1½ in the first round.

References

External links

Tilsia Carolina Varela La Madrid chess games at 365chess.com

1994 births
Living people
Venezuelan chess players
Chess Woman International Masters
Chess Olympiad competitors